Loggerhead turtle may refer to:

Loggerhead sea turtle (Caretta caretta), also called the loggerhead, a species of sea turtle found throughout the world
Loggerhead musk turtle (Sternotherus minor), a species of turtle in the family Kinosternidae, native to the southern US
Alligator snapping turtle (Macrochelys temminckii), a species of turtle in the family Chelydridae, native to freshwater in the US

See also 
 Loggerhead (disambiguation)
 

Animal common name disambiguation pages